Donggaocun Town is a town located on the southern edge of Pinggu District, Beijing, China. As a settlement along the Jingping Expressway, It shares border with Machangying and Pinggu Towns to its north, Xiagezhuang Town to its east, Duanjialing Town to its south, and Mafang Town to its west. In the year 2020, its population was 28,406. Its name was taken from Donggao Village, where the town's government is located.

History

Administrative divisions 
As of the year 2021, Donggaocun Town comprised 22 villages, all of which are listed in the table below:

See also 

 List of township-level divisions of Beijing

References 

Pinggu District
Towns in Beijing